Statistics of the  Cambodian League for the 1984 season.

Overview
Ministry of Commerce FC won the championship.

References
RSSSF

C-League seasons
Cambodia
Cambodia
football